Maulana Abdul Wasey is a Pakistani politician hailing from Religious and Political family of Killa Saifullah District belong to Jamiat Ulema-e Islam (F). He is currently serving as the Leader of Opposition and member of the Provincial Assembly of Balochistan. He is also serving as the committee member of Public Accounts Committee, Committee on Local Government, BDA, Gawadar Dev Authority and Urban P&D.

Background and political career 
Maulana Abdul Wasey was born into an influential and religious family of Killa Saifullah District. He served as Minister of Forest & Wildlife from 1997 to 1999 and two times as ٓ''Senior Minister of Planning & Development from 2002 to 2007 and 2008–2013.
He is also served as member of the Provincial Assembly of Balochistan from 1997 to 1999.

References

Living people
People from Zhob District
Jamiat Ulema-e-Islam (F) politicians
Balochistan MPAs 1997–1999
Balochistan MPAs 2013–2018
Year of birth missing (living people)